The Hungarian handball league system, or Hungarian handball league pyramid is a series of interconnected competitions for professional handball clubs in Hungary. The system has a hierarchical format with a promotion and demotion system between competitions at different levels.

Men

The tier levels
For the 2015–16 season, the Hungarian handball league system is as follows:

Lower divisions
For the 2015–16 season, the lower divisions for each of the Counties is as follows:

Evolution of the Hungarian men's handball league system

Women

The tier levels

For the 2015–16 season, the Hungarian handball league system is as follows:

Lower divisions
For the 2015–16 season, the lower divisions for each of the Counties is as follows:

Evolution of the Hungarian women's handball league system

Cup competitions

Magyar Kupa (men's handball) (Magyar Kupa férfi)

Magyar Kupa (women's handball) (Magyar Kupa női)

External links
Hungarian Handball Federation 

Handball in Hungary
Handball leagues in Hungary
Sports league systems